Deadnaming is the act of referring to a transgender or non-binary person by a name they used prior to transitioning, such as their birth name. Deadnaming may be unintentional, or a deliberate attempt to deny, mock or invalidate a person's gender identity.

Transgender and non-binary people seeking to avoid deadnaming may face administrative or bureaucratic obstacles to changing their names. Published authors who have later transitioned may be troubled by the appearance of their former name in bibliographic metadata records that are nearly impossible to update. Some social media platforms have implemented policies to avoid deadnaming, such as standardizing the use of preferred names rather than legal names or formally banning the practice of deadnaming.

Background 

As part of gender transition, some transgender and non-binary people adopt a new name, often going from a masculine or feminine given name to one which better aligns with their gender identity. In the 2010s, transgender activists popularized the term deadname (i.e. a name that is dead) to refer to such a former name. The Oxford English Dictionary attests the use of deadname on Twitter in 2010, and use as a verb (i.e. deadnaming) in 2013. The term is typically used derisively, with the implication that referring to a transgender person by their former name is unacceptable. Journalistic style guides, health-practitioner manuals, and LGBT advocacy groups advise adopting transgender people's self-identified name and pronouns, even when referring to them in the past, prior to transitioning.

Trans people who wish to avoid being deadnamed can sometimes face significant bureaucratic and administrative obstacles. The legal name change itself requires time, money, and effort. Changing corresponding information such as names, emails, and class schedules in some institutions (such as schools) can be difficult. Like misgendering, deadnaming can be a form of overt aggression or a microaggression, indicating that the target is not fully accepted as a member of society. Transgender activists consider the deadnaming of homicide victims and high-profile celebrities by news media to be a violation of privacy, and a contributing factor to transphobia.

Deadnaming may also be done accidentally by people who are otherwise supportive of trans individuals, such as supportive family members or friends who have not yet become accustomed to using a trans person's new name. Repeated failures to avoid deadnaming, however, can be considered disrespectful.

Christopher Reed, a professor of history and scholar of queer culture, argued that objecting to deadnaming "inhibits efforts toward self-acceptance and integration". Grace Lavery argued that the freedom to deadname is not covered within the principles of academic freedom. Disputes surrounding the legitimacy of deadnaming have led to disputes within the LGBT community, with some stating that deadnaming itself is a tangible harm, and others arguing that the policing of deadnaming would resemble a "re-education camp".

Queer scholar Lucas Crawford has theorized that some transgender people insist on preventing deadnaming in part as a strategy of prospective self-assertion: "by insisting on the primacy of the present, by seeking to erase the past, or even by emotionally locating their 'real self' in the future, that elusive place where access (to transition, health care, housing, a livable wage, and so on) and social viability tend to appear more abundant." Correcting deadnaming by third parties is cited as a way to support trans people.

When trans journalist and University of California professor Theresa Tanenbaum transitioned in 2019, finding herself unable to remove or have her deadname retracted from old publications, she argued that there were broader implications to deadnaming that affected not only the trans community, but other groups in general. Agreeing with journalist Oliver-Ash Kleine of the Trans Journalists Association, Tanenbaum stated, "you might want to change your name on past work to erase from your identity the traces of an abusive former partner, or because you’ve converted to a different religion, among many other reasons." She suggested that deadnaming could happen to a wide variety of vulnerable groups within and outside of the trans community, and that for herself, it has been frustrating and harmful to have media outlets refuse to remove her deadname from old articles. Jaye Simpson, writing for Briar Patch Magazine, added that Black and Indigenous communities and trans members within these communities are also at risk for deadnaming, recalling Canada's settler-colonial history, the replacing of Indigenous traditional names with Anglican names in Canada's residential school system (an offence that can now be reverted by legal name change under Canadian law, a process typically made free to residential school survivors), and the inability for western culture to grasp non-binary and Two-spirit identities. 

While deadnaming most often affects trans people, it can affect a multitude of different groups. For example, as pointed out by Amy Lazet and Brian M. Watson in their editorial piece on retroactive author name changes, "Chinese names are typically structured so that the name listed first is the surname while the second-order name is the given name. South Indians, on the other hand, do not typically have a surname, and are known only by their given name. In order to fulfill the Western-based authorial naming criteria, the father’s given name is commonly used, often leading to confusion as to who deserves the credit for the publication - the author or their father. Similarly, women in academia have traditionally faced issues related to assuming a partner’s name. If a woman has established a professional reputation under her maiden name, how can she continue to associate that record with herself if she changes her name upon marriage or divorce?" In Theresa Tanenbaum's case, she claimed that it was left up to the individual news platform whether her deadname would be retracted or removed, or just left permanent, with no particular legislation in place to prevent this.

Consequences 
A 2021 survey by The Trevor Project showed that trans and nonbinary youth who changed their name, gender marker, or both on legal documents, including birth certificates and driver's licenses, had lower rates of suicide attempts.

Cataloging metadata 
For institutions such as libraries, trans and LGBTQ+ names generally have no distinct cataloguing rules by which to address an individual author under. Traditional cataloguing conventions under Anglo-American Cataloging Rules 2 (AACR2) or MARC cataloguing have different ways of handling authors using multiple pseudonyms, maiden names, pen names or surnames, but no specific rule for deadnames. AACR2 is equipped to handle dead surnames if applied by the cataloguer properly, as "according to the Anglo-American Cataloging Rules (AACR2), one should enter a compound surname under the element by which the person prefers to be entered. Sometimes one can tell this by typography or by searching the person’s name in the bibliography of their own book. However, in most cases, a cataloger does not know. If the cataloger cannot determine the author’s wishes, the cataloger should look at how their name is listed in reference source in the person’s language or country of residence or activity." While dead surnames could still appear under this method, especially for obscure authors whose wishes are not made known, AACR2 would render a deadname hidden while still allowing readers and researchers to find all catalogued works by that author in a specific library. This would be especially applicable to asexual people who face deadnaming after a surname change, but does not address broader name changes for trans or non-binary people. This is especially true for transgender individuals changing their gender-specific given name to a different name; for example, actor Elliot Page may be catalogued by his deadname in library records due to the deadname appearing on old videos he appeared in, while cataloguers unaware of Page's name change or gender identity preferences may use the deadname simply out of ignorance or confusion.

Traditional library cataloguing features fields for an author's given name, surname and gender. As noted by Anne Welsh of Cataloging and Indexing Group in their 2019 editorial, this format can lead to issues with deadnaming and falsely assuming gender identity. Using classic author Vladimir Nabokov as an example, Welsh stated, "obviously Nabokov’s identity has been inferred from his work and has defaulted to “male.” Without highlighting specific individuals here, it is clear that the issues of identity and of dead-names (when someone does not want their former, other-gendered name to be associated with them after they have transitioned to the gender with which they identify) is an important one. Movie database IMDb recently responded to demands from actors to remove links between dead-names and names for actors who have transitioned, unless the actor wants the link to be in place. It is worth being aware of the implications of retaining such links in library authority data, and of the similar issue around the 375 field for recording gender. If you ingest authority data it may be simpler to remove the 375 field from all your data at the point of ingestion."

Corporate and political responses 

Some web platforms such as Facebook, YouTube, and Gmail allow a certain number of name changes per user profile, allowing for any number of reasons for a name to be changed; having fixed metadata, such as a deadname on a published book with an ISBN, is almost impossible to remedy. Some academic publishers and scientific journal publishers have a deadnaming policy allowing trans authors to fix their metadata, reflecting their preferred name. In the case of publications with a fixed identifier, oftentimes trans authors follow what authors switching from maiden to married surname and vice versa have sometimes done, which is to republish their creative work, or works, as new editions with their preferred name while trying to take old ones with the deadname out of print. Some media metadata web platforms may still portray the deadname as the primary author and edition.

In 2013, the English Wikipedia elicited media coverage over its response to Chelsea Manning's public transition. The article about Manning was initially quickly renamed, but a protracted dispute ensued; the matter was ultimately taken up by the site's Arbitration Committee, which imposed sanctions on editors espousing transphobia, but also on those making accusations of transphobia. Wikimedia Foundation executive Sue Gardner expressed disappointment over the handling of Wikipedia's response.

The Internet Movie Database (IMDb) changed its rigid policy on cast names in 2019, allowing actors and actresses to change and remove birth names and deadnames from their official profiles. This move came after trans actress Laverne Cox pointed out deadnaming on Amazon subsidiaries like IMDb as being "the ultimate insult", with GLAAD spokesperson Nick Adams agreeing and calling deadnaming an "invasion of privacy", sparking a protest over the practice of deadnaming in media metadata. IMDb released a statement saying, "IMDb now permits the removal of birth names if the birth name is not broadly publicly known and the person no longer voluntarily uses their birth name. To remove a birth name either the person concerned or their professional industry representative simply needs to contact IMDb's customer support staff to request a birth name removal. Once the IMDb team determines that an individual's birth name should be removed – subject to this updated process – we will review and remove every occurrence of their birth name within their biographical page on IMDb." It is not yet clear whether other Amazon media metadata platforms like Goodreads or the main Amazon shopping website will update policies on deadnaming.

In response to actor Elliot Page coming out as transgender in December 2020, media streaming service Netflix removed Page's deadname from its metadata in the credits of movies the actor had appeared in as a female, including The Tracey Fragments, Juno, Hard Candy, and others. Writer Grayson Gilcrease, who investigated the situation, speculated that Netflix's actions were the result of Page's popularity in the TV series The Umbrella Academy. IMDb changed metadata for Elliot Page in 2020 to reflect his preferred name, even on lesser-known productions; for example, the 2003 Lifetime Movie Network TV movie Going For Broke, about a family affected by a parent's gambling addiction, now features the preferred name "Elliot Page" in the credits list for the role of character Jennifer Bancroft.

On March 12, 2021, the North Carolina Department of Public Instruction announced that its student information system would display each student's "preferred name" rather than birth name, which would eliminate deadnaming on state reports, student report cards, and teacher grade books.

In late June 2021, the website Fandom announced new LGBT guidelines across its websites in addition to the existing terms of use policy that prohibits deadnaming transgender people across their websites. The guidelines include links to queer-inclusive and trans support resources, and further guidelines were released in September 2021 related to addressing gender identity.

In popular culture 
The phenomenon of deadnaming, especially towards trans and other LGBTQ+ individuals, has been explored in fictional media.

Books 
Felix Ever After by Kacen Callender features titular character Felix, a black queer youth, being maliciously deadnamed in public, leading to the character trying to find out who deadnamed him. Pre-transition photos of Felix are also posted, which leads to him being bullied.

Film 
 In 2013 film Dallas Buyers Club, the character Rayon, a trans woman, is forced to deadname herself and present as male in order to appease her estranged father when asking for money on her life insurance policy.

In the 2017 Chilean film A Fantastic Woman, protagonist Marina, a trans woman, is bullied, harassed and deadnamed by police. Marina has not legally changed her name or gender identifier on her identification card, so her deadname and birth sex appear on the card.

Television 
In the 1980 WKRP in Cincinnati episode "Hotel Oceanview", Herb Tarlek flirts with and kisses a beautiful trans woman named Nikki, with whom Herb went to school when she presented as male. After discovering that she used to be a football jock named "Nick", Herb deadnames her and argues that "just because I kissed him, it doesn't make me gay". WKRP had previously discussed trans identity in its third episode, in which Johnny is asked by Jennifer Marlowe to stop Herb from hitting on her, which he does by lying to Herb that she is transgender and "a result of the most cunningly successful sex change operation in medical history."

On the American crime drama series Cold Case, the 2007 episode "Boy Crazy" depicts a 16-year old tomboy in the 1960s named Sam. Her school principal insists on calling her "Samantha" as "Sam is a boy's name". Her parents later send her to a mental hospital where she is subjected to electroshock treatment as conversion therapy, that leaves her in a vegetative state. Another episode "Daniela" depicts a teenage runaway living on the street in the 1970s, who commits suicide. Daniela is later deadnamed by her mother and by the detectives investigating her case when it is revealed that she is transgender.

Adam Torres is a transgender boy in the Canadian television drama series Degrassi: The Next Generation. Adam dreads visiting his grandmother, as he will have to use his deadname in front of her. Adam also faces deadnaming and bullying in school, and uses a fake ID to hide his deadname in public places.

See also 
 Anti-LGBT rhetoric
 Lavender linguistics
 LGBT rights in the United States
 Naming ceremony
 Naming law

References 

Transgender identities
Human names
Discrimination against transgender people
Naming controversies